Jan Władysław Woś (born April 19, 1939, in Warsaw) is a Polish historian, essayist, as well as fiction writer, bibliophile and book collector.

He graduated from the University of Warsaw discussing a thesis on Dante's philosophical system (De amore in Dantis Divina Comoedia quaestiones). He studied later in Milan, Louvain, Florence, Pisa, Bonn, and Heidelberg. He has taught History of the Eastern Europe at the Universities of Pisa (1976-1987), Heidelberg (1985–86), Trento (1987-2009), and Venice (1990–91), also contributing to anthropological research in both Africa and Amazonia.

His fields of interest are Polish history in the Sixteenth Century and History of the Roman Church, particularly regarding Italian/Polish relations. Having obtained his Italian citizenship in 1987, he was awarded a “laurea honoris causa” from the Polish University Abroad of London.
He is a Member of the Société Historique et Littéraire Polonaise de Paris, and of the Polish Society of Arts and Sciences Abroad in London.

He owns remarkable collections of rare books, prints, engravings, parchments from the 10th to the 16th centuries, and topographical maps, all related to Polish history and culture.
He contributes to international periodicals, and is in the course of publishing largely informative and intellectually stimulating excerpts from his memoires and diaries.

References

Living people
1939 births
20th-century Polish historians
Polish male non-fiction writers
University of Warsaw alumni
Commanders of the Order of Polonia Restituta
Academic staff of the University of Pisa
Academic staff of the University of Trento